Haripur Band railway station (Urdu and ) is located in Haripur band, Gujranwala district of Punjab province, Pakistan.

See also
 List of railway stations in Pakistan
 Pakistan Railways

References

External links

Railway stations in Gujranwala District
Railway stations on Karachi–Peshawar Line (ML 1)